Cârța may refer to:
 Cârța, Harghita, a commune in Harghita County, Romania
 Cârța, Sibiu, a commune in Sibiu County, Romania
 Cârța Monastery